The politics of Rwanda reflect Belgian and German civil law systems and customary law takes place in a framework of a semi-presidential republic, whereby the President of Rwanda is the head of state with significant executive power, with the Prime Minister of Rwanda being the constitutional head of government.

Legislative power is vested in both the government and the two chambers of parliament, the Senate and the Chamber of Deputies. On 5 May 1995, the Transitional National Assembly adopted a new constitution which included elements of the constitution of 18 June 1991 as well as provisions of the 1993 Arusha peace accord and the November 1994 multiparty protocol of understanding.

National legislature 
In Rwanda the Chamber of Deputies is composed of eighty Deputies. Among them, fifty-three Deputies are elected by direct universal suffrage in secret, elected from a fixed list of names of candidates proposed by political organizations or independent candidates; twenty-four women elected by specific electoral colleges in accordance with the national administrative entities; two Deputies elected by the National Youth Council; one Deputy elected by the National Council of Persons with Disabilities.

Senate is composed of twenty six members. Among them, there are twelve Senators elected by the specific councils in accordance with the administrative entities; eight Senators appointed by the President of the Republic; four Senators designated by the National Forum of Political organizations; one Senator elected among lecturers and researchers of Public Universities and higher learning institutions; and one Senator elected among lecturers and researchers of Private Universities and higher learning institutions.

Historical background

After its military victory in July 1994, the Rwandese Patriotic Front organized a coalition government similar to that established by President Juvénal Habyarimana in 1992. Called The Broad Based Government of National Unity, its fundamental law is based on a combination of the constitution, the Arusha accords, and political declarations by the parties. The MRND party was outlawed.

Political organizing was banned until 2003. The first post-war presidential and legislative elections were held in August and September 2003, respectively.

The biggest problems facing the government were the reintegration of more than 2 million refugees returning from as long ago as 1959; the end of the insurgency and counter-insurgency among ex-military and Interahamwe militia and the Rwandan Patriotic Army, which is concentrated in the north and south west; and the shift away from crisis to medium- and long-term development planning. The prison population will continue to be an urgent problem for the foreseeable future, having swelled to more than 100,000 in the 3 years after the war. 

The government prohibits any form of discrimination by gender, ethnicity, race or religion. The government has passed laws prohibiting emphasis on Hutu or Tutsi identity in most types of political activity.

Political-economical focus 
From 2005 to 2010 the political headcount ration on national poverty lines decreased by more than 10 percent and the life expectancy of about 64 years is higher than that of similar Sub-Sahara African countries as well as other low income countries.

In 2011, Rwanda's  emissions totaled 0.1 metric tons per capita, which was much lower than similar Sub-Sahara African countries as well as other low income countries. Rwanda´s school enrollment rate is much higher than similar Sub-Sahara African countries as well as other low income countries.

As of 2014, Rwanda was still considered a low income country with $7.890 billion GDP, based on U.S. dollars, with a total population of 11.34 million people.

As of 2015 Rwanda had made a shift towards economic improvement, centralizing its foreign exchange around coffee and tea production, "helping to reduce poverty and inequality". The World Bank has praised Rwanda´s efforts.
Kagame has reached out to large companies, such as Costco and Starbucks, who as of 2015 were the two largest buyers of Rwandan coffee beans.

Executive branch

|President
|Paul Kagame
|Rwandese Patriotic Front
|24 March 2000
|-
|Prime Minister
|Édouard Ngirente
|Social Democratic Party
|30 August 2017
|}
The President of Rwanda is elected for a seven-year term by the people. The Prime Minister and the Council of Ministers are appointed by the president. The president has numerous powers that include creating policy in conjunction with the Cabinet, signing presidential orders, put into effect the prerogative of mercy, negotiating and passing treaties, commanding the armed forces, and declaring war or a state of crisis.

Current Presidential Overview 
The current President of Rwanda is Paul Kagame, born in 1957. He is the 6th President of Rwanda and was elected in 2003. In 2007, the former president, Pasteur Bizimungu, was released from prison on a presidential pardon. Kagame was reelected in 2010, receiving 93.1 percent of the votes cast. Since taking office, Kagame has raised business, reduced crime and corruption, and has attracted the likes of many foreign investors.

Kagame has not groomed anyone to be his successor, so there is nothing that points to who his successor could or should be.

President Paul Kagame and his Rwandan Patriotic Front are the dominant political forces in Rwanda. There is only one registered opposition party and many political opponents have fled into exile.

President Kagame received military training in Uganda, Tanzania and the United States. He was a founding member of current Ugandan President Yoweri Museveni's rebel army in 1979 and headed its intelligence wing, helping Mr Museveni take power in 1986.

Legislative branch
The Parliament (Inteko Ishinga Amategeko or Parlement) has two chambers. The Chamber of Deputies (Umutwe w'Abadepite/Chambre des Députés) has 80 members, 53 of them elected for a five-year term by proportional representation with a 5% threshold, 24 (female members) elected by provincial councils, 2 by the National Youth Council and 1 by the Federation of the Associations of the Disabled. It is the only legislative chamber in the world where women (45) outnumber men (35).

The Senate (Umutwe wa Sena or Sénat) has 26 members elected or appointed for an eight-year term: 12 elected by provincial and sectoral councils, 8 appointed by the president to ensure the representation of historically marginalized communities, 4 by the Forum of political formations and 2 elected by the staff of the universities. Additional former presidents can request to be member of the senate. Rwanda is a one party dominant state with the Rwanda Patriotic Front in power. Opposition parties are allowed, and are represented in Parliament, but are widely considered to have no real chance of gaining power.

Political parties and elections

Judicial branch
The Supreme Court of Rwanda is the highest judicial power in Rwanda.  It and the High Council of the Judiciary oversee the courts of lower ordinary jurisdictions and courts of the special jurisdictions in Rwanda. The Supreme Court consists of the Court President, Vice President, and 12 judges.

Established in 2001, the Gacaca Court was established by the National Unity Government to try cases of genocide against the Tutsis.

Judges are nominated by the president of the republic, after consulting with the Cabinet and the Superior Council of the Judiciary. They are then approved by the Senate. The court president and vice president are appointed for 8-year nonrenewable terms.

With regard to the legal profession, although the Rwanda Bar Association has been in existence since at least 1997, there is no clear indication as to how certain demographic groups, such as women, have fared in the legal field.

Decentralization system

Rwanda is composed of 5 provinces, 30 districts, 416 sectors, 2,148 cells and 14,837 villages.

Key ministers 

 President: Paul Kagame
 Prime minister: Dr. Edouard Ngirente
 Agriculture & animal resources: Dr. Gérardine Mukeshimana
 Cabinet affairs: Ines Mpambara
 Defence: Maj. Gen. Albert Murasira
 Emergency Management: Marie Solange Kayisire
 Education: Dr. Valentine Uwamariya
 Family & gender: Dr. Jeannette Bayisenge
 Finance & economic planning: Dr. Uzziel Ndagijimana
 Foreign affairs & co-operation: Dr. Vincent Biruta
 Health: Dr. Daniel Ngamije
 Infrastructure: Amb. Claver Gatete
 Internal security: Alfred Gasana
 Justice/attorney-general: Dr. Emmanuel Ugirashebuja
 Local government: Jean-Marie Vianney Gatabazi
 Natural resources: Amb. Dr. Jeanne d’Arc Mujawamariya
 President's office: Judith Uwizeye
 Public service & labour: Fanfan Rwanyindo Kayirangwa
 Sports: Aurore Mimosa Munyagaju
 Youth and Culture: Rosemary Mbabazi
 Trade & industry: Beata Habyarimana
 ICT and Innovation: Paula Ingabire
 Minister of National Unity and Civic Engagement: Dr. Jean-Damascène Bizimana

Ministers of State 
 Minister of State in the Ministry of Local Government in charge of Social Affairs: Assumpta Ingabire
 Minister of State in the Ministry of Justice in Charge of Constitutional and Legal Affairs: Amb. Solina Nyirahabimana
 Minister of State in the Ministry of Finance and Economic Planning in charge of Economic Planning: Dr. Claudine Uwera
 Minister of State in the Ministry of Finance and Economic Planning in Charge of the National Treasury: Richard Tusabe
 Minister of State in the Ministry of Education in charge of Primary and Secondary Education: Gaspard Twagirayezu
 Minister of State in the Ministry of Education in Charge of ICT and TVET Education: Claudette Irere
 Minister of State in the Ministry of Health in charge of Primary Healthcare: Lt Col Dr. Tharcisse Mpunga  
 Minister of State in the Ministry of Foreign Affairs and International Cooperation in charge of the East African Community: Prof. Manasseh Nshuti
 Minister of State of the Ministry of Youth and Culture: Edouard Bamporiki
 Minister of State of the Ministry of Agriculture and Animal Resources: Dr. Jean Chrysostome Ngabitsinze

Other Cabinet Members 
 Chief Executive Officer of Rwanda Development Board: Clare Akamanzi

International organization participation
Rwanda is member of
ACCT,
ACP,
AfDB,
C,
CCC,
CEEAC,
CEPGL,
ECA,
FAO,
G-77,
IBRD,
ICAO,
ICFTU,
ICRM,
IDA,
IFAD,
IFC,
IFRCS,
ILO,
IMF,
Intelsat,
Interpol,
IOC,
IOM (observer),
ITU,
NAM,
OPCW,
UN,
UNCTAD,
UNESCO,
UNIDO,
UPU,
WCL,
WHO,
WIPO,
WMO,
WToO,
WTrO

Rwanda joined the Commonwealth of Nations in 2009, making the country one of only two in the Commonwealth without a British colonial past; the other being the former Portuguese colony Mozambique.

References

External links
Official website of the Republic of Rwanda
Official website of the Office of the Prime Minister of Rwanda
Official website of the Office of the Prime Minister of Rwanda - Directory of Ministries and web addresses